Touching Starlight (or Starlight) is a 1996 Chinese film made for television.

It was the first film to star the actress Zhang Ziyi. It was made for Chinese television on a low budget and was later released on Video CD without English subtitles. English subtitles for the film were later created by some fans of Zhang Ziyi and the subtitled version released on the Internet.

External links

References 

1996 television films
1996 films
Chinese television films
Chinese drama films